Edgardo Arasa is an Argentine former footballer who played for clubs from Argentina and Chile.

References
 Profile at BDFA 

Living people
Argentine footballers
Argentine expatriate footballers
Club Atlético Atlanta footballers
Unión de Santa Fe footballers
Chacarita Juniors footballers
Everton de Viña del Mar footballers
San Marcos de Arica footballers
Primera B de Chile players
Chilean Primera División players
Expatriate footballers in Chile
Association football defenders
Year of birth missing (living people)
Footballers from Buenos Aires